Dr Cedric Howell Swanton (Kew, Victoria, 23 March 1899 - Sydney, 11 September 1970) was an Australian physician 
and psychiatrist.

Biography

Swanton was educated at Scotch College and the University of Melbourne, then went to the United Kingdom for postgraduate studies in surgery in London and Edinburgh.  On his return to Australia in 1929 he worked as a general practitioner, but returned to London in 1933 to study psychiatry at the Tavistock Clinic.

In 1937 he opened a practice in Sydney as a consultant psychiatrist and was appointed to the honorary staff of the Royal Prince Alfred Hospital psychiatric clinic, remaining there until retiring in 1959.

Although trained in psychoanalysis, Swanton followed the theory of biological psychiatry, which maintained that mental problems were best treated by physical methods. He was one of the first Australian psychiatrists to use electroconvulsive therapy, persisting with this technique throughout the 1950s and mentoring some psychiatrists of the next generation, including the notorious Harry Bailey, in its use. Swanton also performed leucotomy on many patients.

References

Garton, S. (2002) Swanton, Cedric Howell, in Australian Dictionary of Biography, Vol. 16,  p. 352. (Melbourne University Press: Melbourne).

1899 births
1970 deaths
Australian psychiatrists
Psychiatrists from Melbourne
People educated at Scotch College, Melbourne
University of Melbourne alumni